Johann Gottfried Roesner (or Rösner) (21 November 1658 – 7 December 1724) was an official from Royal Prussia (a fief of the Crown of Poland) executed following the Tumult of Thorn.

Roesner was born in Züllichau (Sulechów) in Brandenburg's Neumark. The Burgrave of Thorn (Toruń) by 1703, he was the town's burgomaster and the curator of the municipal Thorn Gymnasium by 1706. As were most other leading citizens, he was of the Lutheran faith.

Following the Tumult of Thorn between Catholics and Lutherans in the summer of 1724, Roesner was sentenced to death for "neglecting his duty and countenancing tumult" by the Polish supreme court in Warsaw. He died in Thorn.

External links 
 Short biography 

1658 births
1724 deaths
People from Sulechów
18th-century executions
People from the Margraviate of Brandenburg
People from Royal Prussia
History of Christianity in Poland
Toruń
People executed by the Polish–Lithuanian Commonwealth
18th-century Protestant martyrs
18th-century Lutherans
18th-century Polish–Lithuanian businesspeople